Stemonosudis gracilis is a species of fish found in tropical waters of the Atlantic, Indian, and Western Pacific.

Size

References 

Paralepididae
Taxa named by Vilhelm Ege
Fish described in 1933